Anatoli Vladimirovich Fedotov (born May 11, 1966) is a Russian former professional ice hockey player who played four games in the National Hockey League.

Career
He began his career with his hometown team Kristall Saratov before moving to the Soviet Hockey League with HC Dynamo Moscow. He represented the USSR in the 1985 and 1986 World Junior Ice Hockey Championships. He also played on the Soviet Union's 1987 Canada Cup team.  He then moved to North America in 1992 and played one game for the Winnipeg Jets, scoring two assists.  He spent the season in the American Hockey League with the Moncton Hawks. Though he’d already played one game in the NHL, he was ruled ineligible for the rest of the season due to only signing an AHL contract, and was made available for the 1993 draft. He was then drafted 238th overall by the Mighty Ducks of Anaheim in the 1993 NHL Entry Draft and managed to play three regular season games but didn't register a point.  He spent two seasons in the International Hockey League with the San Diego Gulls before moving to Japan, signing with New Oji Seishi Tomakomai where he was voted the league's best player.  He then played in Finland's SM-liiga with Tappara and Sweden's Elitserien with HV71 before returning to Oji.  After two seasons in Japan, Fedotov returned to Russia and split 2000-01 with Molot-Prikamie Perm and Vityaz Podolsk before retiring.

He has the distinction of being the only NHL player to be selected in the NHL Entry Draft after playing his first NHL game.

Career statistics

Regular season and playoffs

International

References

External links

1966 births
Living people
Anaheim Ducks draft picks
HC Dynamo Moscow players
HV71 players
Mighty Ducks of Anaheim players
Moncton Hawks players
Molot-Prikamye Perm players
Oji Eagles players
Sportspeople from Saratov
San Diego Gulls (IHL) players
Soviet ice hockey defencemen
Russian ice hockey defencemen
Tappara players
HC Vityaz players
Winnipeg Jets (1979–1996) players